Lukáš Migaľa (born 4 July 1990) is a Slovak footballer who currently plays for MFK Dukla Banská Bystrica as a right back.

Club career

FO ŽP Šport Podbrezová
Migaľa made his Fortuna Liga debut against Dunajská Streda on 7 March 2015 and in the 66th minute he was booked by yellow card.

References

External links
 FO ŽP Šport Podbrezová official club profile
 Fortuna Liga profile
 
 Futbalnet profile
 Eurofotbal profile

1990 births
Living people
Slovak footballers
Association football midfielders
MŠK Rimavská Sobota players
FK Železiarne Podbrezová players
FK Dukla Banská Bystrica players
Slovak Super Liga players
2. Liga (Slovakia) players
People from Hnúšťa
Sportspeople from the Banská Bystrica Region